Schreckensteinia inferiorella is a moth in the family Schreckensteiniidae. It was described by Zeller in 1877.

References

Schreckensteinioidea
Moths described in 1877